Shiragaon is a village in Hukkeri taluka of  Belagavi district of Karnataka, India.

Demographics
As per 2011 census data, the village has a total population of 3,644 of which 1,824 are males and 1,820 are females.

References

Villages in Belagavi district